Mordellistena fulvipennis is a beetle in the genus Mordellistena of the family Mordellidae. It was described in 1932 by Scegoleva-Barovskaja.

References

fulvipennis
Beetles described in 1932